-Norpseudoephedrine, or (−)-norpseudoephedrine, is a psychostimulant drug of the amphetamine family. It is one of the four optical isomers of phenylpropanolamine, the other three being cathine ((+)-norpseudoephedrine), (−)-norephedrine, and (+)-norephedrine; as well as one of the two enantiomers of norpseudoephedrine (the other being cathine). Similarly to cathine, -norpseudoephedrine acts as a releasing agent of norepinephrine (EC50 = 30 nM) and to a lesser extent of dopamine (EC50 = 294 nM). Due to the 10-fold difference in its potency for inducing the release of the two neurotransmitters however, -norpseudoephedrine could be called a modestly selective or preferential norepinephrine releasing agent, similarly to related compounds like ephedrine and pseudoephedrine.

See also 
 Cathine
 Phenylpropanolamine
 Cathinone
 Pseudoephedrine
 Ephedrine

References 

Phenylethanolamines
Substituted amphetamines
Enantiopure drugs
Norepinephrine releasing agents
Stimulants